Red Hill is a suburb of Auckland, in northern New Zealand. Located  to the southeast of Auckland CBD, under authority of the Auckland Council. The suburban area of Red Hill makes up the southernmost part of the Auckland metropolitan area, however the majority of the area is rural. The suburb lies on an ancient Pā Site known in Māori as Pukekiwiriki. The area is also situated on a no longer active volcano (one of Auckland's smaller volcanic cones), and an old fault line in the region. Red Hill is located in the Manurewa-Papakura ward, one of the thirteen administrative divisions of Auckland city.

History
Red Hill was once a sacred Pā site for local iwi in Papakura. With panoramic views of the entire Auckland Region, it once was used as a lookout point during the Māori wars to see the incoming waka from the Manukau Harbour and movements through the surrounding native forest. Also the soil on the hill was used to grow and contain the kai of the local Māori. The area is known to have rich and fertile soil ever since the community was founded as well as other rural areas throughout the Papakura District.

During the major reformation of local government in 1989, the Red Hill area was included into the Papakura District boundaries.

From October 2010, after a review of the Royal Commission on Auckland Governance, the entire Auckland Region will be amalgamated into a single city authority. As well as the current Papakura District, all other territorial authorities will be abolished and the entire area will be dissolved into a single Auckland city council. The suburb of Red Hill will be separated into the urban ward of Manurewa-Papakura, as well as the rural ward of Franklin, under the Auckland Council.

People
Red Hill is a very diverse area of both rural and urban picturesque living. The top and northern side of the hill is known as a high economic living area, with multimillion-dollar estates and views of the greater Auckland metropolitan area and Manukau Heads, the eastern and south-eastern views the rural areas of Franklin District and the Bombay Hills towards Waikato, with the low-lying areas closer to Papakura being low economic areas run by the state and Housing New Zealand.

Demographics

Red Hill had a population of 2,796 at the 2018 New Zealand census, an increase of 309 people (12.4%) since the 2013 census, and an increase of 216 people (8.4%) since the 2006 census. There were 792 households, comprising 1,419 males and 1,377 females, giving a sex ratio of 1.03 males per female. The median age was 29.8 years (compared with 37.4 years nationally), with 774 people (27.7%) aged under 15 years, 633 (22.6%) aged 15 to 29, 1,137 (40.7%) aged 30 to 64, and 252 (9.0%) aged 65 or older.

Ethnicities were 50.6% European/Pākehā, 38.8% Māori, 25.1% Pacific peoples, 8.4% Asian, and 1.8% other ethnicities. People may identify with more than one ethnicity.

The percentage of people born overseas was 21.1, compared with 27.1% nationally.

Although some people chose not to answer the census's question about religious affiliation, 45.2% had no religion, 40.2% were Christian, 5.4% had Māori religious beliefs, 1.1% were Hindu, 0.4% were Muslim, 0.5% were Buddhist and 2.0% had other religions.

Of those at least 15 years old, 279 (13.8%) people had a bachelor's or higher degree, and 465 (23.0%) people had no formal qualifications. The median income was $30,500, compared with $31,800 nationally. 321 people (15.9%) earned over $70,000 compared to 17.2% nationally. The employment status of those at least 15 was that 1,098 (54.3%) people were employed full-time, 201 (9.9%) were part-time, and 138 (6.8%) were unemployed.

Education

References

External links
Papakura District Council
New Auckland Council
Photographs of Red Hill held in Auckland Libraries' heritage collections.

Suburbs of Auckland